The Great American Baking Show is an American cooking competition television series and an adaptation of The Great British Bake Off (which is aired in the United States under the title The Great British Baking Show). Its first season aired on ABC under the title The Great Holiday Baking Show. The show is the second licensed adaptation of the GBBO format in the United States. In 2013, CBS produced one season of The American Baking Competition, which was hosted by Jeff Foxworthy, with Paul Hollywood and Mexican-American chef Marcela Valladolid as judges.

The first two seasons were hosted by Nia Vardalos and Ian Gomez, with Mary Berry from the original GBBO series and American pastry chef Johnny Iuzzini as judges. The third season was hosted by cookbook author Ayesha Curry and former football player Anthony Adams. Iuzzini returned as judge and was joined by original GBBO judge Paul Hollywood. The season was pulled off schedule following sexual harassment allegations against judge Iuzzini, who was officially fired from the show and ABC. 
Curry and Iuzzini did not return for the fourth season.

On May 4, 2018, the show was renewed for a fourth season. Emma Bunton and Sherry Yard were hired to replace in the following season as host and judge, respectively.

On August 1, 2019, the show was renewed for a fifth season, which premiered on  December 12, 2019.

On May 3, 2022, it was announced that The Roku Channel would be airing a new season of the show, with Paul Hollywood returning as judge, along with Prue Leith from GBBO. Roku also announced plans to air The Great American Baking Show: Celebrity Holiday, featuring celebrities competing to raise money for charity.

Hosts and judges

Season overview

Season 1 (2015)

Season 1 aired under the title The Great Holiday Baking Show and marked a return of the GBBO format to American television after the cancellation of CBS' 2013 series The American Baking Competition. Six bakers participated in the first ABC season. The season was won by Lauren Katz, beating out Nicole Silva and Tim Samson in the finale.

Season 2 (2016–17)

Season 2 returned the following year as The Great American Baking Show with ten bakers and an eight-week competition. The season was won by Amanda Faber, with Stephanie Chen as the runner-up.

Season 3 (2017)

The third season began airing December 7, 2017 with a two-hour premiere. It is the first season hosted by Curry and Adams and for judge Hollywood who last appeared on the 2013 CBS version of the show. This season, baker Antoinette Love, withdrew following a family death, returned to the competition. The season was withdrawn from ABC's schedule on December 13, 2017, following allegations of sexual misconduct by Iuzzini. ABC announced that it would not air the remaining episodes. On December 21, 2017, the day the season finale would have been broadcast, ABC announced that Vallery Lomas won the competition with Cindy Maliniak and Molly Brodak finishing as runners-up.

Season 4 (2018)

The fourth season premiered December 6, 2018, under the title The Great American Baking Show: Holiday Edition. Adams returned for his second season as host, with former Spice Girls singer Emma Bunton as new host. Joining Paul Hollywood on the judging panel is American pastry chef and restaurateur, Sherry Yard. The season was won by Tina Zaccardi. Amanda Nguyen and Andrea Maranville finished as runners-up.

Season 5 (2019)

The fifth season premiered December 12, 2019, with all hosts, Emma Bunton and Anthony Adams and judges, Paul Hollywood and Sherry Yard, returning for the second Holiday Edition.

The contestants entering the tent are Dana Commandatore, Sarita Gelner, Bianca Jackson, Carlos Marquina, Sally Newton, Tanya Clark Ott, Helen Spencer Pantazis, Marissa Troeschel, Alex Willis & and Friar, Brother Andrew. The season was won by Brother Andrew. Dana Commandatore and Marissa Troeschel finished as runners-up.

Celebrity Holiday (2022)

References

External links
 
 

 
American Broadcasting Company original programming
2010s American cooking television series
2010s American reality television series
2015 American television series debuts
2020 American television series endings
American television series based on British television series
US 2
Food reality television series
Cooking competitions in the United States